Sverker of Sweden or Sweartgar of Sweden may refer to:

 Sverker I, King of Sweden 1130
 Sverker II, King of Sweden 1196